Sancho III (c. 1134 – 31 August 1158), called the Desired (el Deseado), was King of Castile and Toledo for one year, from 1157 to 1158. He was the son of Alfonso VII of León and Castile and his wife Berengaria of Barcelona, and was succeeded by his son Alfonso VIII. His nickname was due to his position as the first child of his parents, born after eight years of childless marriage.

During his reign, the Order of Calatrava was founded. It was also in his reign that the Treaty of Sahagún in May 1158 was decided.

Life
Sancho was the eldest son of King Alfonso VII of León and Castile and Berengaria of Barcelona. He was endowed with the "Kingdom of Nájera" in 1152, and according to Carolina Carl never appears in documents as "king of Nájera". His father's will partitioned the kingdom between his two sons: Sancho inherited the kingdoms of Castile and Toledo, and Ferdinand inherited León. The two brothers had just signed a treaty when Sancho suddenly died in the summer of 1158, being buried at Toledo.

During his reign, the castle of Calatrava-la-Vieja was conceded to Abbot Raymond Serrat of Fitero, who proposed using the lay brothers of his monastery as knights to defend this castle. These knights would give rise to the Order of Calatrava, which was confirmed in 1164 by Pope Alexander III.

The Treaty of Sahagún of May 1158, outlined the spheres of conquests between Leonese and Castilian against al-Andalus. A possible division of the Portuguese kingdom among the two sons of Alfonso VII, would come to nothing due to the premature death of Sancho.

Marriage
Sancho married, in 1151, Blanche of Navarre, daughter of García Ramírez of Navarre, and had:

 Alfonso VIII of Castile, his successor
 infante García, who died at birth in 1156, apparently also resulting in the death of Queen Blanche.

Notes

References

Sources

Further reading

Szabolcs de Vajay, "From Alfonso VIII to Alfonso X" in Studies in Genealogy and Family History in Tribute to Charles Evans on the Occasion of his Eightieth Birthday, 1989, pp. 366–417.

1130s births
1158 deaths
Year of birth uncertain
12th-century Castilian monarchs
Castilian House of Burgundy
Castilian infantes
Leonese infantes
Sons of emperors